The 1930 Western Maryland Green Terror football team was an American football team that represented Western Maryland College (now known as McDaniel College) as an independent during the 1930 college football season. In its fifth season under head coach Dick Harlow, the team compiled a 9–0–1 record and shut out eight of its ten opponents. Western Maryland's 1930 season was part of a 27-game undefeated streak that started in 1928 and continued into 1931. Harlow was later inducted into the College Football Hall of Fame.

Schedule

References

Western Maryland
McDaniel Green Terror football seasons
College football undefeated seasons
Western Maryland Green Terror football